Ankh: Battle of the Gods (also known as Ankh 3 and Ankh 3: Battle of the Gods) is a third-person adventure video game, released in 2007 for the Windows  and Macintosh computers, developed by Deck13 and published by BHV Software. As with Ankh and Ankh: Heart of Osiris, Ankh: Battle of the Gods utilises a modified version of the Ogre 3D graphics engine.

Gameplay

Typical to point-and-click adventure games, the characters are controlled with the mouse. Puzzles feature heavily, and are solved by identifying a keyspot within the visible area or by collecting vital items and then activating them in a given location. During the conversations between the characters, the player can select one of several dialogue options, some of which are essential to the puzzles later in the game.

Plot
Players again assume the role of Assil, the protagonist of the two earlier Ankh games, and must prevent Seth, the god of chaos and the desert, from subjugating Ancient Egypt. The additional characters of Thara, Assil's girlfriend, and the Pharaoh are available to control at certain points during the game.

Development
Like its two predecessors, Battle of the Gods was developed by Deck13.

Reception

Domestic

International

Upon release, Ankh: Battle of the Gods received mixed reviews. Commentators praised the stylised cartoon graphics, humour and charm retained from the earlier games in the series. Adventure Gamers remarked that the variety of in-game locations had "allowed the artists to creatively apply their talents, and Battle of the Gods is nothing if not lovely to look at." The music was credited as being excellent, providing "a welcome atmospheric backdrop." In addition, the simplicity of the user interface and inventory system were noted as positive aspects. However, criticisms of the game focused on poorly developed side characters, lacklustre dialogue and the difficulty of certain puzzles.

See also
Overclocked: A History of Violence
Runaway 2: The Dream of the Turtle

References

External links
Official Ankh series website
Official Deck13 website
Official Ogre 3D website
Xider Games website

2007 video games
Adventure games
Deck13 games
MacOS games
Video games based on Egyptian mythology
Video games developed in Germany
Video games set in Egypt
Windows games